Chaceley or Chaseley is a village and civil parish  north of Gloucester, in the Tewkesbury district, in the county of Gloucestershire, England. In 2011 the parish had a population of 125. The parish touches Deerhurst, Eldersfield, Forthampton, Tewkesbury and Tirley.

Landmarks 
There are 20 listed buildings in Chaceley. Chaceley has a church called St John the Baptist and a village hall.

History 
The name "Chaceley" may mean 'Ceatta' or 'Ceadda'; ced 'wood' or cediw, 'yew wood'. Chaceley was "Chaddeslcia" in the 12th century, "Chaddeslega" in the 13th century and "Chaseley" in the 17th century. On 1931 the parish was transferred from Worcestershire to Gloucestershire. On 1 April 1965 44 acres were transferred to Eldersfield parish.

References 

Villages in Gloucestershire
Civil parishes in Gloucestershire
Borough of Tewkesbury